Ebrahimabad-e Cheshmeh Nazer (also Romanized as Ebrāhīmābād-e Cheshmeh Naz̧er) is a village in Bahadoran Rural District, in the Central District of Mehriz County, Yazd Province, Iran. At the 2006 census, its population was 44, in 8 families.

References 

Populated places in Mehriz County